The American Hotel is a former hotel in Detroit, Michigan, that was built in 1926, located on Temple Street and Cass Avenue, located beside the Detroit Masonic Temple and was originally named the Fort Wayne Hotel. The structure is 11 stories high with 300+ rooms and has been vacant since the early 1990s.

References

External links
American Hotel at Detroit1701.org
The American Hotel at Detroiturbex.com.

Unused buildings in Detroit
Hotels in Detroit
Hotel buildings completed in 1926
1926 establishments in Michigan